Pseudocochlespira gramensis is a species of extinct sea snail, a marine gastropod mollusk in the genus Pseudocochlespira from the late Miocene.

Description
A Pseudocochlespira species with a beaded carina situated below mid-whorl. The whorl is made of two fine spirals, with another spiral below the carina.

Etymology
The species name gramensis comes from the Gram Formation in Denmark where the only known specimen was found.

References

Sources
 Kai Ingemann Schnetler & Andreas Grant, "A new Pseudocochlespira species (Gastropoda, Conoidea, Cochlespiridae) from the Gram Clay Formation (late Miocene, Tortonian) of Gram, Denmark". Cainozoic Research, 14(2), pp. 135-137, December 2014.

Cochlespiridae
Prehistoric gastropods
Miocene Europe